Catherine Charnelle Mbengono (born 8 September 1996) is a Cameroonian footballer who plays as a left back for Amazone FAP and the Cameroon women's national team.

Club career
Mbengono played for French Division 2 Féminine club FC Lorient. She joined Éclair de Sa'a on 10 October 2019.

International career
Mbengono represented Cameroon at the 2015 African U-20 Women's World Cup Qualifying Tournament. At senior level, she played the 2018 COSAFA Women's Championship and the 2020 CAF Women's Olympic Qualifying Tournament (fourth round).

International goals
Scores and results list Cameroon's goal tally first

References

1996 births
Living people
Women's association football fullbacks
Women's association football midfielders
Cameroonian women's footballers
Footballers from Yaoundé
Cameroon women's international footballers
FC Lorient players
Cameroonian expatriate women's footballers
Cameroonian expatriate sportspeople in France
Expatriate women's footballers in France
20th-century Cameroonian women
21st-century Cameroonian women